Thokkalikkadu is a village in the Pattukkottai taluk of Thanjavur district, Tamil Nadu, India.

Demographics 

As per the 2011 census, Thokkalikkadu had a total population of 1694 with 844 males and 850 females. In 2001, the sex ratio was 1075. The literacy rate was 69.91.

References 

Villages in Thanjavur district